Svetlana Issakova (born 14 June 1993) is an Estonian former competitive figure skater. She is the 2008 Estonian national champion and won three medals on the ISU Junior Grand Prix series. She competed at three World Junior Championships —achieving her best result, 12th, in 2010— and the 2011 European Championships, where she finished 18th.

Programs

Competitive highlights 
JGP: Junior Grand Prix

References

External links 

 

Estonian female single skaters
1993 births
Living people
Figure skaters from Tallinn
Estonian people of Russian descent